KILN-LP is a low power radio station broadcasting a community radio format from Alturas, California to Modoc County, California.©2021 KILN LPFM 99.1 All Rights Reserved KILN Voicemail(530)233-3535 The KILN Story:  It was late in the year 2013 when a discussion began between the members of The Art Center Executive Board regarding the possibility of creating a low power community radio station for the community of Alturas.  Through a soon to be released FCC open application period, low power radio authorizations of either 10 watts or 100 watts were to be available to only non-profit educational facilities, tribes, or public safety organizations.  It was the vision of the FCC to create opportunities for localized broadcast venues, presented in a noncommercial educational format, and thus add local voices to the radio airwaves. So, that was the “what” in the discussion. The “who”, “how”, and “where” were really unknowns.  The Art Center staff, all volunteers, already had plenty to manage just keeping up with The Art Center (TAC) business. Would there be new individuals interested and willing to participate?  Where would we place the radio antenna and how would we ever get enough resources together to purchase the equipment? The conversation continued when Jeff Cotton, KDUP FM, spoke with us and answered many of our questions and offered his advice and support. We learned that this window of opportunity has been rarely offered by the FCC, and it was easy to see what could be possible.  The idea of a creative local radio broadcast was quickly becoming more and more appealing.  Making only an agreement to “test the water” and submit the application; Dan Dockery, then TAC President and a long time HAM radio operator with a knowledge of radio technology and operating principles, began the work of preparing our application.  Others on the team attempted to negotiate a location for the antenna.  We needed a tall building or structure.  Soon an agreement was made with Jim and Elizabeth Cavasso, representing the Cavasso Corp., to use the rooftop of the Niles Hotel for the antenna and a small upstairs room to house the equipment.   We now had the “where”, and the application was submitted to the FCC. Then we waited, and while we waited we tried on our call sign ideas. We wanted a call sign which represented The Art Center’s work, name, or something meaningful in only four letters.  Then we found it, KILN.  It was perfect. In late January, located in a very long list of LP-FM application results, The Art Center’s name was released by the FCC and we were granted a construction permit, or permission to build a radio station.  The permit allowed for eighteen months to complete the work, with extensions if needed.  The “how” and “who” were then the topics of months of planning and meetings.  Terry Olson initiated a “Founding Member” fund drive and civic organizations welcomed presentations on a new Alturas community radio. It was clear that the amount of funding needed for the equipment to build a new radio station would be nearly impossible to raise without some sort of a sponsorship. Then news of funding, available through the McConnell Foundation and the Shasta Regional Community Foundation for Modoc County nonprofit organizations gave new wind to our sails. The grant application, written by Dan Dockery, Terry Olson, and Bonnie Sherer was submitted with high hopes; and then, we were invited to interview.  The “how” came through grant funding for the purchase of the equipment needed to build a broadcast studio.  Our many thanks to the people at the McConnell Foundation and the Shasta Regional Community Foundation for sharing the dream of an Alturas community radio.The “who” has changed over time.  First, Terry Olson and Dan Dockery, the early leaders and passionate caretakers of the dream, are no longer a part of the KILN team and have directed their interests into other endeavors.  The KILN-LP team has continued growing and is making progress through agreements, ongoing collaboration, and the desire to have a community radio station.  Today, the group has grown and we have been so fortunate to have had access to the huge music library of Glenn Lantz, the 50 years of recording, production and broadcasting experience of Bruce Brown, the interest and enthusiasm of Nick Menkee “Max Stout”, and the electronics expertise of James Paisley.   We met the eighteen month FCC deadline and now you may be listening to us at 99.1 FM, “The KILN”. In late 2019 The Modoc County Arts Council has taken over the running of KILN LP FM 99.1 from the Art Center. Expect big changes and more community content in the coming months. Our local community radio station and recording studio! Supported through donations and funding from a grant administered by the Modoc County Arts Council. Thank you to all who have helped, but were not mentioned here. It has taken and will take the community to build this community radio. Thank You For Your Support

History
The station went on the air as KILN-LPFM 99.1 on July 04, 2014.

References
The Modoc County Arts Council modocarts.org
Bruce Doc Brown Engineer/Producer www.brucedocbrown.com

External links
 

Alturas, California
2015 establishments in California
ILN-LP
ILN-LP
Radio stations established in 2015
Community radio stations in the United States